The junkyard tornado, also known as Hoyle's fallacy, is an argument used to deride the probability of abiogenesis as comparable to "the chance that a tornado sweeping through a junkyard might assemble a Boeing 747."  It was used originally by English astronomer Fred Hoyle (1915–2001), who applied statistical analysis to the origin of life, but similar observations predate Hoyle and have been found all the way back to Darwin's time, and indeed to Cicero in classical times. While Hoyle himself was an atheist, the argument has since become a mainstay in the rejection of evolution by religious groups.

This argument is rejected by the vast majority of biologists.  From the modern evolutionary standpoint, while the odds of the sudden construction of higher lifeforms are indeed improbably remote, evolution proceeds in many smaller stages, each driven by natural selection rather than by chance, over a long period of time.  The transition as a whole is plausible, as each step improves survivability; the Boeing 747 was not designed in a single unlikely burst of creativity, just as modern lifeforms were not constructed in one single unlikely event, as the junkyard tornado posits.

Hoyle's statement
According to Fred Hoyle's analysis, the probability of obtaining all of life's approximate 2000 enzymes in a random trial is about one-in-1040,000:

He further commented:

This echoes his stance, reported elsewhere:

Hoyle used this to argue in favor of panspermia, that the origin of life on Earth was from preexisting life in space.

Details
The junkyard tornado derives from arguments most popular in the 1920s, prior to the modern evolutionary synthesis, which are rejected by evolutionary biologists. A preliminary step is to establish that the phase space containing some biological entity (such as humans, working cells, or the eye) is enormous, something not contentious.  The argument is then to infer from the huge size of the phase space that the probability that the entity could appear by chance is exceedingly low, ignoring the key process involved, natural selection.

Sometimes, arguments invoking the junkyard tornado analogy also invoke Borel's Law, which claims that highly improbable events do not occur.  The usual argument against Borel's "Law" is that if all possible outcomes of a natural process are highly improbable when taken individually, then a highly improbable outcome is certain.  The true law being referenced is actually the Strong Law of large numbers, but creationists have taken a simple statement made by Borel in books written late in his life concerning probability theory and called this statement Borel's Law.

This "Borel's Law" is actually the universal probability bound, which when applied to evolution is axiomatically incorrect. The universal probability bound assumes that the event one is trying to measure is completely random, and some use this argument to prove that evolution could not possibly occur, since its probability would be much less than that of the universal probability bound. This, however, is fallacious, given that evolution is not a completely random effect (genetic drift), but rather proceeds with the aid of natural selection.

The junkyard tornado is also applied to cellular biochemistry. This is comparable to the older infinite monkey theorem but instead of the works of William Shakespeare, the claim is that the probability that a protein molecule could achieve a functional sequence of amino acids is too low to be realised by chance alone.  The argument conflates the difference between the complexity that arises from living organisms that are able to reproduce themselves (and as such may evolve under natural selection to become better adapted and perhaps more complex over time) with the complexity of inanimate objects, unable to pass on any reproductive changes (such as the multitude of manufactured parts in a Boeing 747). The comparison breaks down because of this important distinction.

According to Ian Musgrave in Lies, Damned Lies, Statistics, and Probability of Abiogenesis Calculations:

Reception
The junkyard tornado argument is rejected by evolutionary biologists, since, as the late John Maynard Smith pointed out, "no biologist imagines that complex structures arise in a single step."  Evolutionary biology explains how complex cellular structures evolved by analysing the intermediate steps required for precellular life. It is these intermediate steps that are omitted in creationist arguments, which is the cause of their overestimating of the improbability of the entire process.

Hoyle's argument is a mainstay of creationist, intelligent design, orthogenetic and other criticisms of evolution. It has been labeled a fallacy by Richard Dawkins in his two books The Blind Watchmaker and Climbing Mount Improbable. Dawkins argues that the existence of God, who under theistic uses of Hoyle's argument is implicitly responsible for the origin of life, defies probability far more than does the spontaneous origin of life even given Hoyle's assumptions, with Dawkins detailing his counter-argument in The God Delusion, describing God as the Ultimate Boeing 747 gambit.

See also
Infinite monkey theorem
Irreducible complexity
Law of truly large numbers
Objections to evolution
Watchmaker analogy
Weasel program

References

External links
"A memorable misunderstanding" Fred Hoyle's Boeing-story in the Evolution/Creation literature by Gert Korthof
Evolution Encyclopedia Vol. 1 Chapter 10 Appendix Part 2  Contains a number of Hoyle quotations on evolution.

Origin of life
Creationist objections to evolution
Informal fallacies
Biological evolution
Coincidence